The Church of Santa Coloma d'Andorra is a church in Santa Coloma, Andorra la Vella Parish, Andorra, and is Andorra's oldest church. It is a heritage property registered in the Cultural Heritage of Andorra. It is dedicated to Columba of Sens, patron saint of Andorra. The nave of the church was built in the 8th or 9th century, and the tower in the 12th century. 
In the church are visible remnants of murals made in the 12th century by the Master of Sant Coloma. Most of the murals were removed in 1933 and were in Berlin until 2007. These murals are now present in the Andorran Government Exhibition Hall.

References

Buildings and structures in Andorra la Vella
Roman Catholic churches in Andorra
Cultural Heritage of Andorra